The Washington Summit of 1987 was a Cold War-era meeting between United States president Ronald Reagan and General Secretary of the Communist Party of the Soviet Union Mikhail Gorbachev that took place on December 8–10. Reagan and Gorbachev discussed regional conflicts in Afghanistan, Central America, and Southern Africa, arms control issues for chemical weapons as well as conventional weapons, the status of START negotiations, and human rights. A notable accomplishment of the Washington Summit was the signing of the Intermediate-Range Nuclear Forces (INF) Treaty.

Background
Following the near-breakthrough of the previous year's Reykjavik Summit, and much to the chagrin of many supporters of both leaders, Reagan and Gorbachev began putting resources into INF Treaty negotiations. This, in addition to various troubles foreign and domestic in both countries led to a tense time preceding the Washington Summit.

For Reagan, trouble with the stock market, failure to win approval for Supreme-Court-nominee Robert Bork, and the Iran-Contra scandal were all generating political pressure. Also, criticism from an uncharacteristically large number of notable conservatives including former President Richard Nixon, former Secretary of State Henry Kissinger, commentator William Buckley, as well as members of his own administration resulted in a contentious political atmosphere around the INF Treaty.

Gorbachev too was encountering opposition, not only the INF treaty negotiations, but also his Perestroika reform programs. Despite replacing over 150 senior defense ministers and officers after the Mathias Rust incident, Gorbachev's frustrations were only compounded when just two months before the Washington Summit was held, then-candidate member of the Politburo and supporter of Gorbachev, Boris Yeltsin, denounced the Soviet General Secretary and resigned from his post in an unprecedented and highly controversial move. Though, according to Reagan's Secretary of State George P. Shultz, the Soviet leader was unusually contentious during their late-October meeting in Moscow to finalize the terms of the INF treaty, "Shultz had barely unpacked his bags back in Washington before word came from Moscow that Gorbachev wanted the summit to take place soon. Shevardnadze would be in Washington within two days to see to the final details of the INF Treaty and the summit".

Thus, in spite of outside complications, by the time the summit was set to take place, most of the details relating the INF Treaty had already been worked out. At least a week before the meeting, The New York Times reported that "The Soviet leader and President Reagan are scheduled to sign a treaty Dec. 8 eliminating their nations' shorter-range and medium-range missiles", although the newspaper also said that discussion regarding "reducing long-range, strategic nuclear weapons" was encountering obstacles.

Summit schedule

See also 
List of Soviet Union–United States summits

References

Sources

 (2007) "The INF Treaty and the Washington Summit: 20 Years Later". National Security Archive Electronic Briefing Book No. 238. Edited by Sventlana Savranskaya and Thomas Blanton. The National Security Archive (George Washington University).
 Hayward, Steven F. (2010). The Age of Reagan: The Conservative Counterrevolution 1980-1989. New York: Three Rivers Press. 
 Herring, George C. (2008). From Colony to Superpower: U.S. Foreign Relations Since 1776. New York: Oxford University Press. 
 Keller, Bill. "Politics and Security Concerns Dash Hopes for Extended Trip by Gorbachev". New York Times (31 October 1987).
 Shipler, David K. "Gorbachev Mix On TV Is Tough But Cooperative". New York Times (1 December 1987).

Cold War history of the Soviet Union
Cold War history of the United States
Foreign relations of the Soviet Union
Soviet Union–United States diplomatic conferences
20th-century diplomatic conferences
1987 in international relations
1987 in the United States
Diplomatic visits by heads of government
1987 in politics
1987 conferences
Diplomatic visits to the United States
1987 in Washington, D.C.
December 1987 events in the United States
Presidency of Ronald Reagan